Grandisonia alternans is a species of caecilian in the family Indotyphlidae, endemic to the Seychelles islands of Mahé, Praslin, Frégate, and La Digue.

References 

 

alternans
Endemic fauna of Seychelles
Amphibians described in 1893
Taxonomy articles created by Polbot